Te Rewa Rewa Bridge is a pedestrian and cycleway bridge across the Waiwhakaiho River at New Plymouth in New Zealand.  Its spectacular shape and setting make it a popular landmark.

Location and history
The bridge is part of the northern extension to the Coastal Walkway, connecting New Plymouth with Bell Block. The extension was made possible by a special agreement between Ngāti Tawhirikura hapū and the New Plymouth District Council. A historic pā is located on the north river bank and this was the site of a battle during the Musket Wars; the site is a burial ground (Rewa Rewa). The bridge is located in a semi-rural area.

Design and construction
The bridge was commissioned by New Plymouth District Council and designed and constructed by a consortium of Whitaker Civil Engineering, Novare Design Ltd, Apex Consultants Ltd (now Spiire) and Fitzroy Engineering. The bridge was funded by New Plymouth District Council and the Whitaker family.

Bridge design

The designer, Peter Mulqueen, is quoted as saying he understood that the bridge should "touch lightly" on the Rewa Rewa side of the river, in order to honour the deceased. This ruled out heavier designs like cable stays and angular truss structures. Mulqueen wanted to achieve a bridge with a "harmonious and dignified character".

With the ribs yielding to the prevailing wind, the bridge is aligned to Mount Taranaki. The sacred mountain is framed within the skewed arch when viewed while leaving the sacred ground – promising what is eternal.

Engineering design
The  bridge is designed to accommodate an ambulance and other service vehicles.

River contamination and disturbance was to be avoided, so no temporary piers were used.

Opening
The bridge was officially opened on 5 June 2010. In July 2010, its first full month of operation, the bridge was used by 55,756 cyclists and pedestrians.

Awards
 2011 Arthur G. Hayden Medal for a single recent outstanding achievement in bridge engineering demonstrating innovation in special use bridges.
 2011 Ingenium Excellence Awards.
2011 International Footbridge Award in the aesthetics category (medium span).
2011 Supreme Award from industry group Roading New Zealand
2011 Taranaki Master Builders supreme award for a commercial facility

References

External links

 Coastal Walkway Extension

Steel bridges in New Zealand
Cycleways in New Zealand
Cyclist bridges in New Zealand
Pedestrian bridges in New Zealand
Bridges in Taranaki
Buildings and structures in New Plymouth
Tourist attractions in Taranaki
Bridges completed in 2010
2010s architecture in New Zealand
Transport buildings and structures in Taranaki